The American Rationalist is a bi-monthly journal of secular humanist opinion and commentary published by the Center for Inquiry. S. T. Joshi is the current editor and writes the "Stupidity Watch" column for the journal.

Feature articles cover a wide range of topics from a freethought viewpoint including science and religion, separation of church and state, and applied philosophy. Regular contributors include well-known scholars in the fields of science and philosophy.

Notable columnists
Regular columnists include: 
 Robert M. Price
 William R. Harwood 
 S. T. Joshi
 Michael Paulkovich

References

Irreligion in the United States
Freethought in the United States
Bimonthly magazines published in the United States
Political magazines published in the United States
Secular humanism
Scientific skepticism mass media
Magazines established in 1956